Megacephala somalica is a species of tiger beetle in the subfamily Cicindelinae that was described by Basilewsky in 1966.

References

somalica
Beetles described in 1966